Charles "Gadget" Jones (born April 3, 1957) is a retired American professional basketball player.

Although a raw offensive player, he possessed shot-blocking ability.

Basketball career
A 6'9" forward–center from Albany State University, Jones was selected 165th overall in the 1979 NBA draft by the Phoenix Suns, arriving in the league four years later. He played in 15 seasons with five teams: the Philadelphia 76ers, the Chicago Bulls, the Washington Bullets, the Detroit Pistons and the Houston Rockets.

Jones won an NBA Championship with the Rockets in 1995, appearing in 19 out of 22 postseason contests. He retired three seasons later with career averages of 2.5 points, 4.5 rebounds, and 1.6 blocks per game. His biggest scoring output came on January 8, 1986: 17 points against the team who drafted him, the Suns. Four years later, against the Orlando Magic, Jones blocked a career-best 10 shots, in 49 minutes.

Jones played four minutes in his final NBA game on May 3, 1998; Jones, having done so aged 41 years and 30 days, stands as the 11th oldest player in NBA history.

Personal life
Jones' brothers, Caldwell, Wil and Major Jones, all played at Albany State and in the NBA.

NBA career statistics

Regular season

|-
| align="left" | 
| align="left" | Philadelphia
| 1 || 0 || 3.0 || .000 || – || .250 || .0 || .0 || .0 || .0 || 1.0
|-
| align="left" | 
| align="left" | Chicago
| 3 || 0 || 9.7 || .500 || – || .667 || 2.0 || .3 || .0 || 1.7 || 2.7
|-
| align="left" | 
| align="left" | Washington
| 28 || 4 || 22.8 || .528 || – || .692 || 6.4 || .9 || .8 || 2.6 || 5.9
|-
| align="left" | 
| align="left" | Washington
| 81 || 58 || 19.9 || .508 || .000 || .628 || 4.0 || .9 || .7 || 1.6 || 3.9
|-
| align="left"| 
| align="left" | Washington
| 79 || 64 || 20.4 || .474 || .000 || .632 || 4.5 || 1.0 || .8 || 2.1 || 3.6
|-
| align="left" | 
| align="left" | Washington
| 69 || 49 || 19.0 || .407 || .000 || .707 || 4.7 || .9 || .8 || 1.6 || 2.9
|-
| align="left" | 
| align="left" | Washington
| 53 || 45 || 21.8 || .480 || .000 || .640 || 4.8 || .8 || .7 || 1.4 || 2.6
|-
| align="left" | 
| align="left" | Washington
| 81 || 81 || 27.7 || .508 || – || .648 || 6.2 || 1.7 || .6 || 2.4 || 3.2
|-
| align="left"  | 
| align="left" | Washington
| 62 || 54 || 24.2 || .540 || – || .580 || 5.8 || .8 || .8 || 2.0 || 2.6
|-
| align="left" | 
| align="left" | Washington
| 75 || 32 || 18.2 || .367 || – || .500 || 4.2 || .8 || .6 || 1.2 || 1.1
|-
| align="left" | 
| align="left" | Washington
| 67 || 21 || 18.0 || .524 || .000 || .579 || 4.1 || .6 || .6 || 1.1 || 1.3
|-
| align="left" | 
| align="left" | Detroit
| 42 || 0 || 20.9 || .462 || .000 || .559 || 5.6 || .7 || .3 || 1.0 || 2.2
|-
|style="text-align:left;background:#afe6ba;"| †
| align="left" | Houston
| 3 || 0 || 12.0 || .333 || – || .500 || 2.3 || .0 || .0 || .3 || 1.0
|-
| align="left" | 
| align="left" | Houston
| 46 || 0 || 6.5 || .316 || – || .308 || 1.6 || .3 || .1 || .5 || .3
|-
| align="left" | 
| align="left" | Houston
| 12 || 0 || 7.8 || .400 || – || – || 1.3 || .3 || .2 || .3 || .3
|-
| align="left" | 
| align="left" | Houston
| 24 || 0 || 5.3 || .700 || – || .500 || 1.0 || .2 || .0 || .3 || .6
|- class="sortbottom"
| style="text-align:center;" colspan="2"| Career
| 726 || 480 || 19.4 || .480 || .000 || .618 || 4.5 || .9 || .6 || 1.6 || 2.5

Playoffs

|-
| align="left" | 1985
| align="left" | Washington
| 4 || 0 || 27.5 || .526 || – || .563 || 6.5 || .8 || .8 || 2.5 || 7.3
|-
| align="left" | 1986
| align="left" | Washington
| 5 || 5 || 14.4 || .364 || – || 1.000 || 1.8 || .6 || .4 || .4 || 2.4
|-
| align="left" | 1987
| align="left" | Washington
| 3 || 3 || 18.7 || .600 || – || – || 2.7 || 1.0 || .7 || 1.7 || 2.0
|-
| align="left" | 1988
| align="left" | Washington
| 5 || 1 || 19.0 || .200 || – || .500 || 3.4 || .4 || .4 || .8 || .6
|-
|style="text-align:left;background:#afe6ba;" | 1995†
| align="left" | Houston
| 19 || 0 || 12.5 || .385 || .000 || .333 || 2.3 || .0 || .2 || .5 || .7
|-
| align="left" | 1996
| align="left" | Houston
| 3 || 0 || 2.7 || .000 || – || – || .3 || .0 || .0 || .0 || .0
|-
| align="left" | 1997
| align="left" | Houston
| 1 || 0 || 2.0 || – || – || – || .0 || 1.0 || .0 || .0 || .0
|-
| align="left" | 1998
| align="left" | Houston
| 4 || 0 || 2.8 || – || – || 1.000 || .8 || .3 || .0 || .0 || .5
|- class="sortbottom"
| style="text-align:center;" colspan="2"| Career
| 44 || 9 || 13.4 || .426 || .000 || .556 || 2.5 || .3 || .3 || .7 || 1.5

See also
List of National Basketball Association players with most blocks in a game
List of oldest and youngest National Basketball Association players

References

External links
Career stats at Basketball-Reference

1957 births
Living people
African-American basketball players
Albany State Golden Rams men's basketball players
American expatriate basketball people in France
American expatriate basketball people in Italy
American men's basketball players
Basketball players from Arkansas
Bay State Bombardiers players
Centers (basketball)
Chicago Bulls players
Detroit Pistons players
Houston Rockets players
Maine Lumberjacks players
People from McGehee, Arkansas
Philadelphia 76ers players
Phoenix Suns draft picks
Power forwards (basketball)
Tampa Bay Thrillers players
Washington Bullets players
21st-century African-American people
20th-century African-American sportspeople